José Felipe Márquez Cañizales is one of the 20 municipalities of the state of Trujillo, Venezuela.

Parishes
The municipality consists of the following three parishes, with the seat of each in parentheses:

 Antonio José de Sucre (La Placita) ;
 El Socorro (El Paradero) ;
 Los Caprichos (Los Caprichos)

References

Municipalities of Trujillo (state)